The Ibadan tanker truck explosion was one of the worst ever multi-vehicle accidents, killing between 100 and 200 people near Ibadan, Oyo State, Nigeria on 5 November 2000.

Casualties
Estimates of casualties in the disaster remain imprecise. The police and other rescue services did not offer any assistance until some time after the blast, and so numerous bodies were removed by relatives or volunteer rescuers and privately buried, whilst others were cremated in the fire. Most sources simply give a vague "over 100 dead" despite the official count of 96 recovered bodies, and offer statements that "the final death toll could be much higher". What is certain is that local hospitals were totally swamped with hundreds of badly injured burn victims, creating a major crisis in the country's health service, which simply could not cope with so many badly injured patients in this area.

The Nigerian police reported that they had recovered 115 destroyed vehicles from the roadway in the aftermath of the accident, implying a substantially higher death toll than initially quoted. Later sources however are restricted to using high round figures rather than accurate data, with Namibian sources reporting 150 killed, whilst Indian newspapers suggesting 200 died. Clearly the real figure is not known and never will be known, because of the failure of the authorities to deal effectively with the crisis. Their failure to do so stirred a serious and violent controversy in Nigeria.

Controversy
The crash was surrounded by major controversy because in the previous four months over 150 people had been killed in high profile crashes involving petrol tankers and buses. These crashes had led to such incidents as the Abuja bus crash riots, in which four more people had been killed, as well as growing resentment of the police and civil authorities who failed to take any responsibility for the country's appalling road safety record.

The reason that the police were not present at the scene is a complicated one. The police force with jurisdiction in this region was the Osun State Police, who have been the subjects of numerous corruption complaints. According to local sources, the reason that so many cars were lined up on the motorway before the crash was that the State Police were exacting a toll from motorists from an impromptu roadblock they had set up. This protection racket is what local people said led to the disaster because it caused a jam at an unusual place, causing the tanker driver to brake suddenly, fail, and crash.

The State Police emphatically deny this charge, instead insisting that the jam was due to roadworks, and that there was not one single police officer in the district at the time of the crash. What is certain, is that when a police car did arrive at the still blazing accident site shortly after the crash, and was attacked by a furious mob, set alight and destroyed, the four occupants escaping only after receiving a beating. A police statement said that:

See also
 List of explosions

External links
BBC News Report

"The Namibian" News Report

Explosions in 2000
Fires in Nigeria
Road incidents in Nigeria
2000 road incidents
2000 in Nigeria
2000 fires in Africa
Tanker explosions
November 2000 events in Nigeria
2000 disasters in Nigeria